Alcalus is a small genus of frogs in the family Ceratobatrachidae. It is the only member of the subfamily Alcalinae. Its sister taxon is Ceratobatrachinae. Common name Alcala's dwarf mountain frogs has been proposed for the genus. They are found in Palawan Island (the Philippines), Borneo, and the Malay Peninsula. They prefer semi-aquatic microhabitats.

Etymology
The genus is named in honour of Angel Alcala, a Filipino biologist who has worked with Southeast Asian amphibians.

Description
Compared to the closely related genera Cornufer and Platymantis, Alcalus have an intermediate body size (based on Alcalus baluensis and A. mariae, males measure  and females  in snout–vent length). The head is broad. Skin is coarsely textured, shagreened, or ‘wrinkled’ in appearance. The toe discs are widely expanded; inter-digital webbing is extensive. Males have nuptial pads but lack vocal sacs.

Species
There are five species:
 Alcalus baluensis (Boulenger, 1896)
 Alcalus mariae (Inger, 1954)
 Alcalus rajae (Iskandar, Bickford, and Arifin, 2011)
 Alcalus sariba (Shelford, 1905)
 Alcalus tasanae (Smith, 1921)

References

 
Ceratobatrachidae
Amphibian genera
Amphibians of Asia
Taxa named by Rafe M. Brown
Taxa named by David C. Cannatella
Taxa named by Arvin Cantor Diesmos
Taxa named by Stephen J. Richards